Theodore A. "Ted" Jacobson (born November 27, 1954) is an American theoretical physicist. He is known for his work on the connection between gravity and thermodynamics. In particular, in 1995 Jacobson proved that the Einstein field equations describing relativistic gravity can be derived from thermodynamic considerations.

Jacobson is professor of physics at the University of Maryland's Center for Fundamental Physics. His current research focuses on the dark energy problem and cosmic expansion.

See also

Entropic gravity

References

External links
 Smithsonian/NASA Astrophysics Data System (ADS) search for articles by Jacobson. University of Nottingham mirror search.
 "Jacobson, Theodore - Professor", University of Maryland. Contains this link  to Jacobson's curriculum vitae.
 Ted Jacobson's Home Page at the University of Maryland.
 Marco Frasca, "Ted Jacobson's deep understanding", The Gauge Connection, March 5, 2009.

1954 births
Living people
21st-century American physicists
University of Maryland, College Park faculty
Theoretical physicists